Haplosciadium is a monotypic genus of flowering plants in the family Apiaceae (Umbelliferae). Its only species is Haplosciadium abyssinicum. It is a flat rosette plant endemic to the Afro-alpine zones on East African mountains, occurring on moist valley bottoms above . It engages in geocarpy as an adaptation to living on frost-heaved soils.

References

Monotypic Apiaceae genera
Apiaceae